Prahtip Mitra is an Indian former swimmer. He competed in the men's 100 metre backstroke at the 1948 Summer Olympics.

References

External links
 

Year of birth missing
Possibly living people
Indian male swimmers
Olympic swimmers of India
Swimmers at the 1948 Summer Olympics
Place of birth missing (living people)
Male backstroke swimmers
20th-century Indian people